Brusca is an Italian surname. Notable people with the surname include:

 Carmen Brusca (born 1985), Argentine futsal player and footballer
 Giovanni Brusca (born 1957), Sicilian Mafiosi

Italian-language surnames